The 1972 Yale Bulldogs football team represented Yale University in the 1972 NCAA University Division football season.  The Bulldogs were led by eighth year head coach Carmen Cozza, played their home games at the Yale Bowl and finished in second place in the Ivy League with a 5–2 record, 7–2 overall.

Schedule

References

Yale
Yale Bulldogs football seasons
Yale Bulldogs football